Soferet may refer to:
 Soferet (documentary), a documentary about Aviel Barclay, a female scribe
 Sofer, a ritual scribe in Judaism